Sokola Góra  is a village in the administrative district of Gmina Wielgomłyny, within Radomsko County, Łódź Voivodeship, in central Poland.

International relations

Twin towns — Sister cities
Sokola Góra is twinned with:
  Mysłowice, Poland

References

Villages in Radomsko County